Badshah is a 1964 Hindi-language film directed by Chandrakant and starring Dara Singh, Nishi and Rani.

Cast
 Dara Singh as Raaka "Badshah"
 Nishi as Sheeba / Tingu
 Rani
 Ramayan Tiwari as Salakas
 Tiger Joginder Singh
 Kumud Tripathi as Kaka / Champakali
 Keshav Rana as Sheru
 Radheshyam as Deewan Shamsheer 'Baba'
 Prince Kumali
 Saudagar Singh as Finale wrestler

Music

References

External links

1960s Hindi-language films
1964 films
Films scored by Datta Naik